Relatlimab is a monoclonal antibody designed for the treatment of melanoma. It is used in combination with nivolumab to treat melanoma.

Relatlimab is a Lymphocyte activation gene-3 (LAG-3) inhibitor. It is under development by Bristol-Myers Squibb. It is made using Chinese hamster ovary cells.

History 
, relatlimab is undergoing Phase II/III trials.

The combination nivolumab/relatlimab (Opdualag) was approved for medical use in the United States in March 2022.

Names 
Relatlimab is the United States Adopted Name (USAN) and the international nonproprietary name (INN).

References

External links 
 

Bristol Myers Squibb
Clinical trials sponsored by Bristol Myers Squibb
Experimental drugs
Monoclonal antibodies for tumors